Bellis bernardii, the Corsican daisy, is a member of the family Asteraceae and is an endemic species found in Corsica.

References

bernardii
Flora of Corsica